Lorenz's blind snake (Ramphotyphlops lorenzi) is a species of snake in the family Typhlopidae.

Etymology
The specific name, lorenzi, is in honor of German ornithologist Theodore K. Lorenz.

Geographic range
R. lorenzi is found in Indonesia (Borneo).

References

Further reading
Hedges SB, Marion AB, Lipp KM, Marin J, Vidal N (2014). "A taxonomic framework for typhlopid snakes from the Caribbean and other regions (Reptilia, Squamata)". Caribbean Herpetology (49): 1-61.
Werner F (1909). "Über neue oder seltene Reptilien des Naturhistorischen Museums in Hamburg ". Jahrbuch der Hamburgischen Wissenschaftlichen Anstalten 26: 205-247 (in supplement). (Typhlops lorenzi, new species, p. 209). (in German).

Ramphotyphlops
Reptiles described in 1909